The 2006 California wildfires were a series of wildfires that were active in the state of California during the year 2006. In total, there were 8,202 fires that burned  of land.

Fires 
Below is a list of all fires that exceeded  during the 2006 fire season. The list is taken from CAL FIRE's list of large fires.

References

 
California, 2006
Wildfires in California by year